Lladó (also known as Lledó d'Empordà) is a municipality in the comarca of Alt Empordà, Girona, Catalonia, Spain.

It is a village with an eleventh century Augustinian Monastery and a Romanesque church.

History 
The first documentation of Lladó is dating from 977 year, and it was done on the donation of some vineyard and lands from the Count and Bishop Miró to the Sant Pere de Rodes monastery.

In 1089 the cult and monastic life is restored on the Santa Maria de Lladó church and from that moment, the village life grows around it.

References

External links
 Government data pages 
Lladó Town hall web page (in Catalan)

Municipalities in Alt Empordà